The Elation Freedom Iconic Collection is a bespoke sports car manufactured by California-based automobile manufacturer Elation Motors. Unveiled to the public in mid-November 2020, it is the second car built by the brand.

Specifications 
The Freedom Iconic Collection is powered by a 5.2-liter naturally aspirated V10 with a similar powertrain setup as a Lamborghini Huracan or Audi R8, with a power output of greater than 750 hp. The car is claimed to go from 0-60 mph in just 2.5 seconds, with a top speed of an electronically limited 240 mph. The car will feature a 7-speed dual-clutch automatic transmission.

Design 
The Freedom Iconic Collection, like its electric-powered twin, was designed with the intent to be a luxury hypercar. The hardware for the Freedom will sit in a lightweight carbon-fiber monocoque structure, also featuring an F1-style pushrod suspension, with the overall low profile allowing for a low drag coefficient of 0.28 Cd.

Unveiling and production 
The Freedom Iconic Collection will first be unveiled at the 2022 Geneva International Motor Show alongside its electric-powered twin, and production will begin after the debut if there is enough demand, building no more than 25 examples each year, each priced at 2.3 million each.

References

External links 
 https://elationhypercars.com/freedom_collection

Cars introduced in 2020
2020s cars
Luxury vehicles
Cars of the United States